The Danny Kaye Show is an American old-time radio comedy-variety program. Broadcast on the CBS radio network, it ran  from January 6, 1945 to May 31, 1946.

Format
The Danny Kaye Show featured singing, instrumental music, and various kinds of comedy sketches. In Nobody's Fool, Martin Gottfried wrote about the program: "Everything about it was to be top drawer, beginning with Kaye's then record salary of $16,000 a week (compared to the $100 apiece he had been paid for three minor CBS radio shows in 1940)."

Personnel
In addition to Kaye, the cast included Eve Arden, Lionel Stander, and Frank Nelson as regulars, with the supporting cast including Kenny Delmar, Everett Sloane, Joan Edwards, and Butterfly McQueen. Announcers were Ken Niles and Dick Joy. Music was under the direction of Harry James, Lyn Murray, David Terry, and Harry Sosnik. Dick Mack was the director. The producer was Goodman Ace, described by Gottfried in Nobody's Fool as "radio's premier comedy writer, who had so estimable a reputation that even though the program would be broadcast from Los Angeles, he was able to insist on running it from New York."

A behind-the-scenes influence was Kaye's wife, Sylvia Fine, a producer, composer, and lyricist in her own right. Gottfried wrote, "She demanded and won the right to approve the show's writers." She also wrote for the program, along with Ace and Abe Burrows.

See also
The Danny Kaye Show television program

References

External links 
 www.example.com

Logs
Log of episodes of The Danny Kaye Show from The Digital Deli Too
Log of episodes of The Danny Kaye Show from Jerry Haendiges Vintage Radio Logs
Log of episodes of The Danny Kaye Show from radioGOLDINdex

Scripts

Streaming
Episodes of The Danny Kaye Show from Old Time Radio Researchers Group Library
Episodes of The Danny Kaye Show from Zoot Radio

1945 radio programme debuts
1946 radio programme endings
1940s American radio programs
CBS Radio programs
American comedy radio programs